Light Up The Sky is an EP by Rick Wakeman which contains four new songs.

Wakeman had been asked to write a song specifically for a huge firework display in Newcastle upon Tyne which he was to perform live. He wrote the song "Light Up the Sky" but because of poor ticket sales the event was cancelled. He then released this EP with three additional new songs.

"Light Up the Sky" and "The Bear" were later included on the 1999 compilation The Masters.

Track listing
All songs written by Rick Wakeman.
"Light Up the Sky"
"Simply Free"
"Starflight"
"The Bear"

Personnel
 Rick Wakeman - keyboards
 Chrissie Hammond - lead vocals
 Adam Wakeman - organ
 Stuart Sawney - guitar and drum programming

Production
 Stuart Sawney - engineer 
 Alan Hillary Events Ltd. - cover photograph

References

Rick Wakeman albums
1994 EPs
Progressive rock albums by British artists